Joseph Mensah (born 22 August 1957)  is a Ghanaian politician and member of the Seventh Parliament of the Fourth Republic of Ghana representing the Kwesimintsim Constituency in the Western Region on the ticket of the New Patriotic Party.

References

Ghanaian MPs 2017–2021
1957 births
Living people
New Patriotic Party politicians